Marty Wilford (born April 17, 1977) is a Canadian former professional ice hockey defenceman. He was selected by the Chicago Blackhawks in the 6th round (149th overall) of the 1995 NHL Entry Draft.

In August 2011 Wilford began his coaching career as an assistant coach with the Syracuse Crunch of the American Hockey League. He is married to Michelle Wilford.

Career statistics

References

External links

1977 births
Anaheim Ducks coaches
Canadian expatriate ice hockey players in Germany
Canadian expatriate ice hockey players in Italy
Canadian ice hockey coaches
Canadian ice hockey defencemen
Chicago Blackhawks draft picks
Cleveland Lumberjacks players
Columbus Chill players
Hamburg Freezers players
Hartford Wolf Pack players
Houston Aeros (1994–2013) players
Indianapolis Ice players
Iowa Stars players
Iserlohn Roosters players
Living people
Manchester Monarchs (AHL) players
Milwaukee Admirals players
Norfolk Admirals players
Oshawa Generals players
St. John's Maple Leafs players
SHC Fassa players